Mariano Nicolás Mignini  (born 11 October 1975 in Mar del Plata) is an Argentine football midfielder who is currently playing for Club Atlético Aldosivi.

Career
Born in Mar del Plata, Mignini, known as el Gatito, began playing youth football with local side Kimberley de Mar del Plata. In 1994, he joined rivals Club Atlético Aldosivi, where he would make his senior football debut and help the club reach the Primera B Nacional.

Mignini played in the Argentine Primera División with Chacarita Juniors and Argentinos Juniors.

After Mignini retired from playing football, he became a coach. Along with his cousin, Mignini managed Kimberley de Mar del Plata to its first Liga Marplatense de Fútbol title in 2016.

References

External links

1975 births
Living people
Sportspeople from Mar del Plata
Argentine footballers
Aldosivi footballers
Chacarita Juniors footballers
Argentinos Juniors footballers
Audax Italiano footballers
Argentine Primera División players
Argentine expatriate footballers
Expatriate footballers in Chile
Association football midfielders